The Canton of Cany-Barville is a former canton situated in the Seine-Maritime département and in the Haute-Normandie region of northern France. It was disbanded following the French canton reorganisation which came into effect in March 2015. It consisted of 18 communes, which joined the canton of Saint-Valery-en-Caux in 2015. It had a total of 9,470 inhabitants (2012).

Geography 
An area of farming, forestry and light industry in the arrondissement of Dieppe, centred on the town of Cany-Barville. The altitude varies from 0m (Paluel) to 142 m (Grainville-la-Teinturière) with an average altitude of 58m.

The canton comprised 18 communes:

Auberville-la-Manuel
Bertheauville
Bertreville
Bosville
Butot-Vénesville
Canouville
Cany-Barville
Clasville
Crasville-la-Mallet
Grainville-la-Teinturière
Malleville-les-Grès
Ocqueville
Ouainville
Paluel
Saint-Martin-aux-Buneaux
Sasseville
Veulettes-sur-Mer 
Vittefleur

Population

See also 
 Arrondissements of the Seine-Maritime department
 Cantons of the Seine-Maritime department
 Communes of the Seine-Maritime department

References

Cany-Barville
2015 disestablishments in France
States and territories disestablished in 2015